The Chief Justice of Albania, officially known as the President of the Supreme Court of Albania is the most senior judge of the Supreme Court of Albania, who presides over every activity of the institution: he approves the internal regulations and the structure of the court, issues orders and directives of an administrative nature, supervises the support function, presides the bench in the United College, appoints the Members of the court into distinct Colleges, employs and dismisses Judicial Assistants as well as the court's administrative staff and oversees the management of the annual budget of the court.

External links
 Official Biography of the President of the Supreme Court

References

Supreme Court of Albania